Cedar Crest is a census-designated place (CDP) in Bernalillo County, New Mexico, United States. The population was 958 at the 2010 census. It is part of the Albuquerque Metropolitan Statistical Area.

Geography
Cedar Crest is located in eastern Bernalillo County at  (35.107145, -106.373543), along the eastern base of the Sandia Mountains. It is bordered by the village of Tijeras to the south.

Demographics

At the 2000 census there were 1,060 people, 470 households, and 322 families in the CDP. The population density was 323.9 people per square mile (125.2/km). There were 501 housing units at an average density of 153.1 per square mile (59.2/km). The racial makeup of the CDP was 86.89% White, 1.23% African American, 1.42% Native American, 1.13% Asian, 0.09% Pacific Islander, 6.89% from other races, and 2.36% from two or more races. Hispanic or Latino of any race were 19.81%.

Of the 470 households 23.8% had children under the age of 18 living with them, 57.7% were married couples living together, 8.1% had a female householder with no husband present, and 31.3% were non-families. 26.0% of households were one person and 5.1% were one person aged 65 or older. The average household size was 2.22 and the average family size was 2.64.

The age distribution was 19.2% under the age of 18, 4.6% from 18 to 24, 27.1% from 25 to 44, 36.0% from 45 to 64, and 13.0% 65 or older. The median age was 45 years. For every 100 females, there were 103.1 males. For every 100 females age 18 and over, there were 96.3 males.

The median household income was $50,865 and the median family income was $62,054. Males had a median income of $42,400 versus $28,500 for females. The per capita income for the CDP was $27,263. About 5.1% of families and 7.6% of the population were below the poverty line, including 2.1% of those under age 18 and 10.3% of those age 65 or over.

Education
It is zoned to Albuquerque Public Schools.

Culture
The Tinkertown Museum is located in Cedar Crest.

See also

 List of census-designated places in New Mexico

References

External links

Census-designated places in Bernalillo County, New Mexico
Census-designated places in New Mexico
Albuquerque metropolitan area